Justice Sharp may refer to:

John H. Sharp (1874–1957), associate justice of the Texas Supreme Court
Susie Sharp (1907–1996), chief justice of the North Carolina Supreme Court
Victoria Sharp (born 1956), justice of the Court of Appeal of England and Wales

See also
Judge Sharp (disambiguation)
Justice Sharpe (disambiguation)